The Universitario–Sporting Cristal rivalry is a major rivalry in Peruvian football. Both clubs have been very successful in the Torneo Decentralizado, with a combined total of 44 league titles since the expansion of the competition in 1966.

Clashes between the two teams tend to generate large amounts of excitement, due to the stature of both clubs and the high quality of football on display. From the first classic played in 1956, which ended tied 2–2 with goals from Daniel Ruiz twice to the cream while Roberto Martinez and Enrique Vargas scored for the celestial, the two clubs have met in 196 opportunities in official meetings, Universitario has achieved 74 victories, while Sporting Cristal has 64 wins.

Rivalry 
One of the main reasons for the enmity between the two clubs is due to a series of transfers of footballers emblematic Universitario to Sporting Cristal, starting in the year of 1959 with the signing of Alberto Terry and subsequently signings Héctor Chumpitaz, Eleazar Soria, Percy Rojas, Héctor Bailetti, Juan Carlos Oblitas and Oswaldo Ramírez in 1977. Another cause of this great rivalry between cream and celestial is the amount of international participation that both clubs have been in official tournaments organized by the Confederación Sudamericana de Fútbol, where Universitario Peruvian all over disputed continental cups, with 38 occasions, followed by Sporting Cristal with 33 occasions. To this should be added the popularity of both clubs, as several polls put both teams in the top of preferences along with Alianza Lima.

General statistics

Last 10 matches 

Matches Played:
 Clássic played: 196 clássic.
 Clássic earned by: Sporting Cristal: 62 clássic.
 Clássic earned by: Universitario: 72 clássic.
 Clássic draw: 63 clássic.
 Goals scored by: Sporting Cristal in the clássic: 251 goals.
 Goals scored by: Universitario in the clássic: 248 goals.
 High scoring in classic: 4–0 to favor of Sporting Cristal in 1988, 2003 and 2013, Universitario same score in 1989.

See also 
 Sporting Cristal
 Club Universitario de Deportes
 Peruvian Primera División
 Football rivalries in Peru

References

Peruvian football rivalries
Sporting Cristal
Club Universitario de Deportes